Zeleznik may refer to:

People 
Lukáš Železník (born 1990), a Czech football player
Martin Železník (born 1989), a Slovak football player

Places 
Železnik, Serbia
Železník (village), Slovakia
Żeleźnik, Poland

Other uses 
Železník (horse) (1978–2004), a Czechoslovak racehorse